Jaouad Achab (born 20 August 1992) is a taekwondo practitioner from Belgium. He won the gold medal at the 2014 European Championships Men's 63 kg, and at the 2015 World Championships, becoming Belgium's first World Taekwondo champion.

In 2019, he won one of the bronze medals in the men's bantamweight event at the 2019 World Taekwondo Championships in Manchester, United Kingdom.

References

External links
 
 
 
 

1992 births
Living people
Belgian male taekwondo practitioners
European Games competitors for Belgium
Taekwondo practitioners at the 2015 European Games
Olympic taekwondo practitioners of Belgium
Taekwondo practitioners at the 2016 Summer Olympics
Universiade medalists in taekwondo
Universiade gold medalists for Belgium
European Taekwondo Championships medalists
World Taekwondo Championships medalists
Medalists at the 2015 Summer Universiade
Taekwondo practitioners at the 2020 Summer Olympics
21st-century Belgian people